Partido Popular Democrático may refer to:

 Popular Democratic Party (Puerto Rico), known in Spanish as the Partido Popular Democrático
 Social Democratic Party (Portugal), known in Portuguese as the Partido Popular Democrático between 1974 and 1976